"Can't You Hear My Heartbeat" is a song written by John Carter and Ken Lewis, produced by Mickie Most, and performed by Herman's Hermits. It reached #2 on the Billboard Hot 100 in 1965.  "Can't You Hear My Heartbeat" was kept from the #1 spot by "Stop! In the Name of Love" by The Supremes.

In the United Kingdom it was released as the B-Side of "Silhouettes". The song was featured on their 1965 album, Their Second Album! Herman's Hermits on Tour.

Billboard magazine's Top Hot 100 songs of 1965 ranked it #8.

Other versions
Goldie & the Gingerbreads released a version of the song as a single in 1965 that reached #25 on the UK Singles Chart.
Marianne Faithfull released a version on her 1965 debut album Marianne Faithfull.

References

1965 songs
1965 singles
Songs written by John Carter (musician)
Songs written by Ken Lewis (songwriter)
Cashbox number-one singles
Herman's Hermits songs
Song recordings produced by Mickie Most
MGM Records singles
Decca Records singles